The 7th Rand Grand Prix was a motor race, run to Formula One rules, held on 12 December 1964 at Kyalami, South Africa. The race was run over two heats, each of 25 laps of the circuit, and was won overall by British driver Graham Hill in a Brabham BT11.

This race was the Formula One debut for future triple world champion Jackie Stewart, who secured pole position for the first heat. His car failed on the grid, and Hill won with Mike Spence in second. Stewart took the second heat, but Hill came second to claim the overall victory. Brabham cars filled the first three places, each with different makes of engine.

Results

References
 "The Grand Prix Who's Who", Steve Small, 1995.
 "The Formula One Record Book", John Thompson, 1974.
 Race results at www.silhouet.com 

Rand Grand Prix
Rand Grand Prix
December 1964 sports events in Africa
1964 in South African motorsport